The  was a cabinet-level ministry in the government of the Empire of Japan from 1925-1947.

History
The original Ministry of Agriculture and Commerce was created on 7 April 1881, initially under the Meiji Daijō-kan Cabinet, and then under the Meiji Constitution. It combined the Bureaus of Agriculture, Forestry, Natural History and post station maintenance which were formerly directly under the Prime Minister with the Bureau of Commerce formerly under the control of the Ministry of Finance.

On 1 April 1925, under Prime Minister Takahashi Korekiyo, the Ministry of Agriculture and Commerce was divided into the Ministry of Agriculture and Forestry, and the Ministry of Commerce and Industry. The division was a result of long-standing acrimony within the ministry between the “commerce” portion of the ministry, which sought expanded overseas trade, and the protectionist “agriculture” portion of the ministry which sought to ban imports of food, especially rice.

In 1934, the Ministry of Commerce and Industry divested itself of the iron and steel industry, leading to the formation of the Nippon Steel Corporation. Following the start of the Second Sino-Japanese War, the Ministry of Commerce and Industry found its role changing from promotion of trade and commerce to enforcing restrictions on trade and management of rationing programs. By the middle of  World War II, the Ministry of Munitions, Ministry of Transport and Communications and the Planning Board absorbed most of the functions of the Ministry of Commerce, and the vestigial remains were merged with the Ministry of Agriculture and Forestry to re-establish the Ministry of Agriculture and Commerce on November 1, 1943.  The re-formed ministry was also in charge of distribution of rationed goods.

In the post-war period, the Ministry of Commerce and Industry was re-established briefly under the aegis of the Supreme Commander of the Allied Powers, and was assigned control of electrical power production and electrical power distribution. The Ministry of Commerce and Industry became the Ministry of International Trade and Industry, or MITI on May 25, 1949.

Ministers of Commerce

References

Commerce and Industry
Politics of the Empire of Japan
1925 establishments in Japan
1949 disestablishments in Japan